is an interchange passenger railway station in the city of Kashiwa, Chiba, Japan, jointly operated by East Japan Railway Company (JR East) and the private railway operator Tōbu Railway.

Lines

JR East

The JR East portion of the station has a Midori no Madoguchi staffed ticket office. There are two island platforms serving four tracks, with an elevated station building located above the platforms.

Platforms

Tōbu
The Tōbu station has two bay platforms serving four tracks. All trains reverse at this station. The station building is elevated and located above the platforms. It is connected to the JR station by a concourse on the second floor.

Platforms

History
The present-day JR East station opened on 25 December 1896. The Tobu station opened on 9 May 1911. The station was absorbed into the JR East network upon the privatization of JNR on 1 April 1987. In July 1998, the platforms for the Jōban Line were lengthened by three meters. The South Exit to the station was opened on 8 April 1999.

From 17 March 2012, station numbering was introduced on all Tōbu lines, with Kashiwa Station becoming "TD-24".

Passenger statistics
In fiscal 2019, the JR portion of the station was used by an average of 125,490 passengers daily, making it the 27th busiest on the JR East network. 

In fiscal 2019, the Tobu station was used by an average of 147,553 passengers daily (entering and exiting passengers). The average daily passenger figures for each operator in previous years are as shown below.

Surrounding area
 Kashiwa City Office
 Chiba Prefectural Higashi Katsushika High School
 Kashiwa Junior High School

See also
 List of railway stations in Japan

References

External links

 JR East Station information 
 Tobu Line Station Information 

Railway stations in Chiba Prefecture
Jōban Line
Stations of East Japan Railway Company
Stations of Tobu Railway
Railway stations in Japan opened in 1896
Tobu Noda Line
Kashiwa